The 2020–21 season was the 64th season of competitive association football in Saudi Arabia. The season featured the first-ever Women's Football League in Saudi Arabia.

National teams

Saudi Arabia national football team

Friendlies

2022 FIFA World Cup qualification & 2023 AFC Asian Cup qualification

Second round: Group D

Saudi Arabia national under-23 football team

Friendlies

Saudi Arabia national under-20 football team

Friendlies

2020 AFC U-19 Championship 

The AFC announced the cancellation of the tournament on 25 January 2021, leaving the hosting rights for the 2023 AFC U-20 Asian Cup with Uzbekistan.

Group C

2021 Arab Cup U-20

Group D

Knockout stage

Saudi Arabia national under-17 football team

Friendlies

2020 AFC U-16 Championship 

The AFC announced the cancellation of the tournament on 25 January 2021, leaving the hosting rights for the 2023 AFC U-17 Asian Cup with Bahrain.

Group D

2021 Arab Cup U-17 

The tournament was initially scheduled to be held from 1 to 17 July, but was postponed indefinitely, and later cancelled.

Group A

Men's football

AFC Champions League

2020

Group stage

Group A

Group B

Group C

Group D

Knockout stage

Round of 16 

|}

Quarter-finals 

|}

Semi-finals 

|}

2021

Qualifying play-offs

Play-off round 

|}

Group stage

Group A

Group C

Group D

Ranking of second-placed teams

Leagues

Saudi Professional League

Prince Mohammad bin Salman League

Saudi Second Division

Group A

Group B

Third-place play-off

Final

Saudi Third Division

Cup competitions

King Cup

Final

Super Cup

Women's football

League

Football League

Notes

References 

2020–21 in Saudi Arabian football

2020 in Saudi Arabian sport
2021 in Saudi Arabian sport
Saudi Arabia
Saudi Arabia
2020 sport-related lists
2021 sport-related lists